Krow may refer to:
Roswell International Air Center (ICAO abbreviation)
King Krow, stage name of wrestler Dan Kroffat
Alias of American open-source programmer Brian Aker
Boss in the list of Donkey Kong characters

As a radio sign, KROW may refer to:
KROW, Cody, Wyoming radio station
Former call sign of Oakland, California radio station KNEW (AM)
Former call sign of Dallas, Texas radio station KLUV
Former call sign of Lovell, Wyoming radio station KWHO
Former call sign of Dallas, Oregon radio station KWIP